Morunasaurus is a genus of lizards in the family Hoplocercidae. The genus is endemic to northwestern South America and extreme southeastern Central America.

Species
The genus Morunasaurus contains three species which are recognized as being valid.

Nota bene: A binomial authority in parentheses indicates that the species was originally described in a genus other than Morunasaurus.

References

Further reading
Dunn ER (1933). "Amphibians and Reptiles from El Valle de Anton, Panama". Occ. Pap. Boston Nat. Hist. Soc. 8: 65–79. (Morunasaurus, new genus, pp. 75–76).

Lizard genera
Morunasaurus